William Francis Plummer (born March 21, 1947) is an American former professional baseball player and manager, and current hitting coach for the Redding Colt 45s. He played in Major League Baseball as a catcher in 1968 and then from 1970 to 1978, most notably as a member of the Cincinnati Reds dynasty that won four National League pennants and two World Series championships between 1970 and 1976. He also played for the Chicago Cubs and the Seattle Mariners.

Playing career
Plummer was born in Oakland, California and attended Anderson Union High School in Anderson, California. After one year at Shasta College, he was signed by the St. Louis Cardinals on April 25, 1965, as an amateur free agent. Plummer played three years in the Cardinals' minor league system. While playing for Sparky Anderson with the Modesto Reds in 1967, Phillies scout Eddie Bockman noted that Plummer was "strong, can catch everyday," has "all the desire and hustle in the world," and "recommend a [Rule 5] draft on him if he is available." The Chicago Cubs saw the same thing and drafted Plummer on November 28, 1967, in the Rule 5 Draft.

Plummer spent nearly all of 1968 on the bench and catching in the bullpen in Chicago due to the rules on sending Rule 5 drafted players to the minor leagues. Plummer made his major league debut with the Cubs on April 19, 1968 at the age of 21 in a  road loss to the Cardinals. Pinch-hitting for Chuck Hartenstein, he struck out against Hal Gilson. He had only one more at-bat that season and played in just two games.

Traded to the Reds for Ted Abernathy on January 9, 1969, Plummer spent the year at Triple-A Indianapolis. He was in the minors again in 1970, but was called up to the pennant-winning Reds in September, long enough to play in four games with nine plate appearances, including his first career hit.

While never a regular starter—he was Johnny Bench's backup catcher during the Big Red Machine years—he did play solid defense with a .983 fielding percentage, but was a lifetime .188 hitter. His most memorable game was in 1974, when he hit two home runs in Philadelphia off hall of famer Steve Carlton.

Plummer's career as a backup catcher was profiled in a Sports Illustrated article in July 1977. "I've always wondered how Bill would do if he played two months straight," said Pete Rose. "He's a physical fitness nut, and if hard work means anything, he would do all right." The article's writer said of Plummer, "He is a private person. He hoards his time and spends it with his wife Robin and two daughters, Gina and Tricia. He doesn't drink, works out, jogs and plays tennis, and during the winter he labors on his father-in-law's northern California cattle ranch.

Coaching
After he retired as a player, Plummer stayed in the Mariners' system, and managed the Wausau Timbers in 1981, and the Triple-A Calgary Cannons from 1986 through 1988. He was the Mariners' third base coach starting in 1989, and when third-year manager Jim Lefebvre was fired after the 1991 season, the franchise's first with a winning  Plummer was promoted for 1992. Seattle finished in last place in his only season as manager, with a  record, and Plummer was let go in October. The club had been sold in July, and he was succeeded in November by Lou Piniella for the 1993 season.

Plummer spent 1993 and 1994 in the Colorado Rockies organization, starting the 1993 season as the AZL Rockies pitching coach and ending the season as the major league bullpen coach in Denver. In 1995, Plummer returned to managing with the Jacksonville Suns, the Detroit Tigers' Double-A affiliate. In the spring of 1996, the International Division of Major League Baseball sent Plummer and other coaches, including Fernando Arroyo, Jim Lefebvre, and Greg Riddoch, to serve as official advisors to the upstart Taiwan Major League.

In 1996, Plummer converted Tigers third baseman Phil Nevin into a catcher in Jacksonville. The Tigers fired Plummer from Jacksonville at the All-Star break, despite winning the Southern League first-half championship, and Plummer finished the season managing Cincinnati's Billings Mustangs.

Plummer went on to manage independent league baseball with the Western Baseball League's Chico Heat from 1997–1999, and Yuma Bullfrogs from 2000-2001. In 2002, he joined the Arizona Diamondbacks' minor-league system, eventually working his way up to their Triple-A affiliate, the Tucson Sidewinders, which he managed in 2007-2008. Plummer managed the Tigres de Aragua for the 2001-02 season. Plummer served as the minor league catching coordinator for the Diamondbacks from 2009 to 2012. He managed the Naranjeros de Hermosillo of the Mexican Pacific League for parts of the 2011-12 and 2012-13 seasons, taking them to the playoffs in 2011-12. Plummer managed the Leones del Caracas to a Venezuelan Winter League championship in 1986-87. He also managed Caracas for the 1988-89 season.

In 2013, he served as manager of the Diamondbacks' Single-A affiliate Visalia Rawhide of the California League in his 22nd season as a minor league coach or manager. In 2014, Plummer reassumed the role of Arizona Diamondbacks catching coordinator. Plummer announced his retirement at the end of the 2017 season, with a career managerial record of  Plummer is a member of the Shasta County Sports Hall of Fame. 

Since 2018, Plummer has been the hitting and catching coach for the summer collegiate Redding Colt 45s.

Managerial record

Summer record

Winter record

Personal life
Plummer's father, William Lawrence Plummer, pitched in the Pacific Coast League from 1921 to 1927, and his uncle, Red Baldwin, was a catcher in the Pacific Coast League from 1915 to 1931. The elder Plummer and Baldwin were teammates in 1924 and 1925 with the Seattle Indians.

Plummer, who resided in Northern California, earned his Bachelor of Arts degree from Chico State University while managing the Chico Heat in the late 1990s, decades after leaving Shasta College after one year and signing with the Cardinals in 1965.

Plummer's former player Edgar Martinez was inducted into the National Baseball Hall of Fame in 2019, and specifically mentioned Plummer in his acceptance speech as having been an important coach during his minor league career. 

In October 2021, a documentary entitled Plum: A Baseball Life, about Plummer's 53-year baseball career, was released.

References

External links

Bill Plummer at SABR (Baseball BioProject)
Bill Plummer at Baseball Almanac
Bill Plummer at The Baseball Cube
Bill Plummer at Pura Pelota (Venezuelan Professional Baseball League)

1947 births
Living people
Major League Baseball catchers
Chattanooga Lookouts managers
Chicago Cubs players
Cincinnati Reds players
Seattle Mariners players
Indianapolis Indians players
Seattle Mariners managers
Baseball players from Oakland, California
Cedar Rapids Cardinals players
Eugene Emeralds players
Modesto Reds players
Spokane Indians players
Seattle Mariners coaches
Colorado Rockies (baseball) coaches
Shasta Knights baseball players
People from Shasta County, California
American expatriate baseball people in Venezuela